Andreas Havlykke (born 27 September 1975) is a retired Danish football striker.

References

1975 births
Living people
Danish men's footballers
Lyngby Boldklub players
FC Nordsjælland players
Nykøbing FC players
Association football forwards
Danish Superliga players